The Portland Nitro is a professional American ultimate team based in Portland, Oregon. The Nitro are members of the American Ultimate Disc League's West Division. The Nitro's first season was 2022.  They play at Providence Park.

References 

Sports teams in Portland, Oregon